John Wesley Porter (May 6, 1860 – January 7, 1941) was a member of the Wisconsin State Assembly.

Biography
Porter was born on May 6, 1860 in Oakland, Jefferson County, Wisconsin. In 1903, he purchased a home near Cambridge, Wisconsin. He died at his home in Cambridge in 1941.

Career
Porter was elected to the Assembly in 1918. Additionally, he was chairman (similar to mayor) and a member of the school board of Oakland. He was a Republican.

References

External links
 

People from Cambridge, Wisconsin
Republican Party members of the Wisconsin State Assembly
Mayors of places in Wisconsin
School board members in Wisconsin
1860 births
1941 deaths
People from Oakland, Jefferson County, Wisconsin